Metrostar Ferry was a passenger ferry service across Manila Bay between Cavite City and Pasay in Metro Manila, Philippines. It is owned and operated by Metrostar Ferry, Inc. 

The route operated between terminals in San Roque, at the back of the Cavite City Hall, and SM Mall of Asia, adjacent to the Shrine of Jesus Church, in Bay City. It is serviced by four Filipino-designed ships, the Doña Carmen, Doña Inez, Doña Avelina and Doña Mercedes. Built in 2006, these ships are twin-hull, twin-engine, fully air-conditioned fiberglass catamarans which can carry between 130 and 550 passengers.

The ferry service ran four times a day and makes a crossing in 45 minutes. The alternative drive from Mall of Asia to Cavite City is approximately two hours via the Manila–Cavite Expressway. 

As of 2018, the ferry service is not in operation.

History

In 2006, Metrostar Ferry, Inc. secured a  loan from the Philippine Export-Import Credit Agency (PhilEXIM) and the state-owned Philippine Veterans Bank to finance the project as part of the government's Manila Bay Transport Project. It purchased Filipino-designed catamarans made by shipbuilders in Navotas and Malabon. Metrostar Ferry made its maiden voyage in July 2007. It was inaugurated on September 24, 2007 by the PhilEXIM.

The company also plans to interconnect with the Pasig River Ferry and open new routes from its Mall of Asia Terminal to Navotas, Bataan (Orion), Bulacan (Hagonoy) and Pampanga (Guagua).

Two ferry boats owned by Metrostar Ferry were destroyed by fire in 2015, while on dock at SM Mall of Asia. The incident was allegedly caused by a spark in one vessel's generator.

Fleet
Metrostar Ferry operated the following vessels (as of December 2012):

 M/V Doña Adelina
 M/V Doña Carmen
 M/V Doña Ines
 M/V Doña Mercedes

Ferry schedule

 Mall of Asia to Cavite City
 07:45 – 08:30
 11:00 – 11:45
 15:00 – 15:45
 18:30 – 19:15
 Cavite City to Mall of Asia
 06:30 – 07:15
 09:30 – 10:15
 13:30 – 14:15
 16:30 – 17:15

References

Ferry companies of the Philippines
Ferry transportation in the Philippines
Transportation in Metro Manila
Transportation in Cavite